Chasseur de primes is a Lucky Luke adventure written by Goscinny and illustrated by Morris. It is the thirty-ninth book in the series and it was originally published in French in 1972 and in English by Cinebook in 2010 as The Bounty Hunter.

Plot
Following a short introduction on the general status of bounty hunters in the Old West, we get introduced to the titular character, Elliot Belt, a notorious and unscrupulous representative of his trade.

Lucky Luke decides to find His Highness, a prime stallion belonging to wealthy horse rancher Bronco Fortworth to avoid the risk of an injustice. But Fortworth, convinced that the Cheyenne Wet Blanket (a former farmhand of his) is the thief, launches a wanted notice and a reward of 100,000 dollars to who will bring the Indian. Belt is interested in the offer ande repeatedly offers Lucky Luke to join, but the lone cowboy declines his offer.

While Luke seeks to find Wet Blanket first, fearing that this hunt could lead to an Indian war, Elliot Belt is obsessed with the reward he could receive. He brings together several other bounty hunters to attack the Cheyenne village and find Wet Blanket. This incident nearly causes an Indian war and gets Luke captured by the Cheyenne, but Wet Blanket, proclaiming his innocence, frees Luke, interrupts the war before it can begin, and willingly agrees to stand trial. A protest by Fortworth and the bounty hunters is deflected by Luke, and when Belt kidnaps the Indian to collect the bounty, Wet Blanket simply walks away when the other bounty hunters ambush Belt, and is collected by Luke.

On the way back to the town of Cheyenne Pass, where the trial is to be held, Luke and Wet Blanket discover His Highness in the wild, and bring him along to the courthouse. Another dramatic change takes place when Thelma, Fortworth's estranged wife, comes to testify at the trial and admits that it was she who released the stallion, jealous of the affection that Fortworth had for the animal. The Fortworth couple, who had separated, reconciles. Wet Blanket is exonerated, and Fortworth gives the reward to the Cheyennes.

As Luke leaves the court, Belt attempts to kill him for revenge, but his plan fails. Upon seizing him, Luke learns that Belt is wanted for "trying to cause an Indian war". Instead of delivering him to the sheriff, Luke persuades the latter to release Belt; but in turn, the federal warrant is still posted, leaving Belt to be chased by bounty hunters himself. The story ends with the Cheyenne using Fortworth's money to open an amusement park.

Notes
 Elliot Belt's appearance is an obvious nod on Lee Van Cleef, particularly his acting roles as merciless bounty hunter.
The scene where Elliot as a child denounces himself to his father (for a reward) for having chopped down a cherry tree is inspired by the myth concerning George Washington.
In one scene, the story makes a humorous pass at the Lone Ranger character Tonto.

External links
 Lucky Luke official site album index 
 Goscinny website on Lucky Luke

Comics by Morris (cartoonist)
Lucky Luke albums
1972 graphic novels
Works by René Goscinny